The men's 1,500 metres at the 2016 IPC Athletics European Championships was held at the Stadio Olimpico Carlo Zecchini in Grosseto from 11–16 June.

Medalists

See also
List of IPC world records in athletics

References

High jump
High jump at the World Para Athletics European Championships